Sheikh Azim is an Indian footballer who since 2009 has played for Mohammedan in the I-League as a defender. For Mohammedan, he was involved in a game against his former club Mohun Bagan.

External links
 Mohunbagan.com. Retrieved 7 January 2010.

References

Living people
Indian footballers
1988 births
Mohammedan SC (Kolkata) players
Footballers from Kolkata
Association football defenders